Streptomyces mauvecolor is a bacterium species from the genus of Streptomyces which has been isolated from soil. Streptomyces mauvecolor produces peptimycin.

See also 
 List of Streptomyces species

References

Further reading

External links
Type strain of Streptomyces mauvecolor at BacDive -  the Bacterial Diversity Metadatabase	

mauvecolor
Bacteria described in 1961